The 1991 NCAA Division I women's basketball tournament began on March 13 and ended on March 31. The tournament featured 48 teams. The Final Four event was hosted by the University of New Orleans, and held at the Lakefront Arena in New Orleans. The Final Four teams consisted of Tennessee, Stanford, Connecticut, and Virginia, with Tennessee defeating Virginia 70-67 (OT) to win its third NCAA title.    Virginia's Dawn Staley was named the Most Outstanding Player of the tournament.

This tournament was the first to adopt the FIBA's 10ths-second clock during the final minute of each period, unlike whole seconds as in past seasons. One exception is Lakefront Arena, which was an AS&I scoreboard and wasn't modified until summer 1991.

Notable events
James Madison earned an 8 seed and beat the 9 seed, Kentucky in a first round match-up. This set up a game between the Dukes, and the number 1 seed in the East Regional Penn State, with the game played on the Penn State home court. The game started out in favor of the home team, as they scored the first eleven points of the game, forcing JMU coach Sheila Moorman to call a timeout. The lead extended, with the Nittany Lions pulling out to a 24–9. The coach decided to stress defense and it helped, but Penn State held a 41–29 lead at halftime. The team continued to stress defense in the second half, and the Dukes held Penn State to six points in the first eight minutes of the second half. The Dukes took a lead, and were up by four points with under twelve minutes to go. Penn State cut the lead to two points, and with 19 seconds to go attempted a three-point shot for the win, but the shot was blocked, and JMU would upset the top seed. It was only the second time in the ten-year history of the NCAA tournament that a number 1 seed had failed to advance to the regional. Coincidentally, first time was in 1986 when number 1 seeded Virginia failed to reach the regional when they were defeated by James Madison.

10th seeded Vanderbilt upset 7th seeded South Carolina, then went on to defeat the second seeded Purdue 69–63, to advance to the regional, where they would lose to Auburn. 10th seeded Lamar upset 7th seeded Texas, then went on to a 20-point victory over second seeded LSU. Oklahoma State faced Michigan State in a game that would go to three overtimes. Oklahoma State won 96–94.

Connecticut defeated Clemson in the Regional final to earn their first trip to a Final Four. There they would take on one seeded Virginia. Connecticut's coach, Geno Auriemma started his women's basketball college coaching career as an assistant coach under Debbie Ryan at Virginia.  In a game identified in 2009 as one of the top ten games in UConn history, Tonya Cardoza scored 16 points for the Cavaliers, including four three throws in the final second to help Virginia defeat Connecticut 61–55. Tonya Cardoza would go on to become an assistant coach at Connecticut for many years.

In the other semifinal game, Tennessee defeated Stanford 68–60 to advance to the championship game against Virginia. The Cavaliers would lead by five points with under two minutes to go, but Tennessee's Dena Head scored, was fouled, and converted the free throw to cut the margin to two points. Virginia failed to score, then fouled Head with seconds to go, who sank the free throws to send the game to overtime. Head continued to hit free throws in overtime, and the Volunteers went on to win the game and the national championship 70–67.

Qualifying teams – automatic
Forty-eight teams were selected to participate in the 1991 NCAA Tournament. Twenty-one conferences were eligible for an automatic bid to the 1991 NCAA tournament.

Qualifying teams – at-large
Twenty-seven additional teams were selected to complete the forty-eight invitations.

Bids by conference
Twenty-one conferences earned an automatic bid.  In ten cases, the automatic bid was the only representative from the conference. Two conferences, Metro Atlantic and Patriot sent a single representative as an at-large team.  Twenty-five additional at-large teams were selected from ten of the conferences.

First and second rounds

In 1991, the field remained at 48 teams. The teams were seeded, and assigned to four geographic regions, with seeds 1-12 in each region. In Round 1, seeds 8 and 9 faced each other for the opportunity to face the 1 seed in the second round, seeds 7 and 10 played for the opportunity to face the 2 seed, seeds 5 and 12 played for the opportunity to face the 4 seed, and seeds 6 and 11 played for the opportunity to face the 3 seed. In the first two rounds, the higher seed was given the opportunity to host the first-round game. In most cases, the higher seed accepted the opportunity. The exceptions:

 Seventh seeded South Carolina   played tenth seeded Vanderbilt at Vanderbilt
 Sixth seeded Maryland played eleventh seeded Holy Cross at Holy Cross
 Sixth seeded Iowa  played eleventh seeded Montana at Montana
 Fourth seeded Michigan State played fifth seeded Oklahoma State at Oklahoma State
 Second seeded LSU  played tenth seeded Lamar at Lamar

The following table lists the region, host school, venue and the thirty-two first and second round locations:

Regionals and Final Four

The Regionals, named for the general location, were held from March 22 to March 24 at these sites:
 East Regional  Palestra, Philadelphia, Pennsylvania (Host: Villanova University)
 Mideast Regional  Thompson–Boling Arena, Knoxville, Tennessee (Host: University of Tennessee)
 Midwest Regional  Frank Erwin Center, Austin, Texas (Host: University of Texas)
 West Regional  Thomas and Mack Center, Las Vegas, Nevada (Host: University of Nevada at Las Vegas)

Each  regional winner advanced to the Final Four, held March 30 and March 31 in  New Orleans, Louisiana  at  the Lakefront Arena, co-hosted by University of New Orleans & Tulane University.

Bids by state

The forty-eight teams came from thirty states, plus Washington, D.C. California and Texas had the most teams with four each.  Twenty states did not have any teams receiving bids.

Brackets
First and second-round games played at higher seed except where noted.

Mideast regional – Knoxville, TN

West regional – Las Vegas, NV

East regional – Philadelphia, PA

Midwest regional – Austin, Texas

Final Four – New Orleans, LA

Record by  conference
Seventeen conferences had more than one  bid, or at least one win in NCAA Tournament play:

Seven conferences  went 0-1: Big Sky Conference, MAAC, North Star Conference, Ohio Valley Conference,  Southern Conference, and WAC

All-Tournament team

 Dawn Staley, Virginia
 Tonya Cardoza, Virginia
 Daedra Charles, Tennessee
 Dena Head, Tennessee
 Sonja Henning, Stanford

Game officials

 Mike Brooks  (semifinal)
 June Courteau (semifinal)
 Art Bomengen (semifinal)
 John Morningstar (semifinal)
 Patty Broderick (final)
 Lou Pitt (final)

See also
 1991 NCAA Division I men's basketball tournament

References

Tournament
NCAA Division I women's basketball tournament
NCAA Division I women's basketball tournament
Basketball
College basketball tournaments in Louisiana
1991 in sports in Louisiana